X7 or X-7 may refer to:

Arts, media, and entertainment
 Mega Man X7, the seventh game in the Mega Man X series
 WrestleMania X-Seven, seventeenth annual WrestleMania event in 2001

Electronics
 Canon EOS Kiss X7, a digital SLR camera
 Nokia X7-00, a smartphone

Transportation

Air transportation
 Chitaavia, a former Russian airline (IATA Code: X7)
 Lockheed X-7, an American experimental aircraft
  Ruhrstahl X-7, a German anti-tank missile of the Second World War

Automobiles
 BMW X7, 2018–present German full-size SUV
 Domy X7, 2016–2018 Chinese mid-size SUV
 Landwind X7, a 2015–2019 Chinese compact SUV
 Hanteng X7, a 2016–present Chinese mid-size SUV
 Oshan X7, a 2019–present Chinese mid-size SUV
 Sehol X7, a 2020–present Chinese mid-size SUV
 Beijing X7, a 2020-present Chinese mid-size SUV

Rail transportation
 SJ X7, a Swedish trainset

Bus services
X7 Coastrider, a bus service in Scotland between Aberdeen and Perth

Watercraft
 HMS X7, a Royal Navy X class submarine